Game publisher may refer to:

 Card game publisher
 Board game publisher
 Video game publisher